Embrun may refer to:

 Embrun, Hautes-Alpes, a town and former archbishopric in southeastern France
 Embrun Cathedral, the national monument and former cathedral there
 Roman Catholic Archdiocese of Embrun
 Embrun, Ontario, a community in eastern Ontario, Canada
 Ottawa/Embrun Aerodrome, the local airport of that community.
 Embrun Panthers, the ice hockey team of Embrun.

See also
Sir Ebrum, a character from the television series Kirby: Right Back at Ya!